This is a list of notable Azerbaijani dramatists and playwrights, which is arranged alphabetically.

A 
 Suleyman Sani Akhundov
 Sakina Akhundzadeh
 Hamid Arzulu

B 
 Vidadi Babanli

H 
 Abdurrahim bey Hagverdiyev

I 
 Magsud Ibrahimbeyov
 Mirza Ibrahimov

J 
 Jafar Jabbarly
 Huseyn Javid

M 
 Afag Masud

O 
 Mammed Said Ordubadi

R 
 Nigar Rafibeyli
 Natig Rasulzadeh
 Suleyman Reshidi
 Rasul Rza
 Anar Rzayev

S 
 Abbas Sahhat
 Huseyngulu Sarabski

V 
 Najaf bey Vazirov

See also

 List of playwrights
 List of playwrights by nationality and year of birth

 
Lists of dramatists and playwrights
Dramatists